The FIA Formula 3 International Trophy was a FIA-sanctioned international formula series that ran in 2011 for Formula Three cars. The Trophy was the first international Formula Three series since the demise of the European Formula Three Championship in 1984, and was created to increase the appeal of the category, which had seen the various F3 championships suffer from falling grid sizes.

The trophy comprised three existing events for Formula Three cars, the Pau Grand Prix, Masters of Formula 3 and Macau Grand Prix, and one event from both the British F3 and Formula 3 Euro Series. Drivers registered in any of the national F3 series were eligible to enter the contest, and they competed alongside the drivers entered into the individual events.

After one season, which was won by Spanish driver Roberto Merhi, the Trophy was replaced by the FIA Formula 3 European Championship for 2012.

Season summary 

The series began at Hockenheim on 30 April, and finished on 20 November at the Guia Circuit after five meetings. Roberto Merhi was crowned champion after Masters of F3 meeting at Zandvoort. German driver Marco Wittmann finished as runner-up despite driving as guest driver in the first meeting of the season, in Hockenheim. If he had participated as championship driver in these meeting, he would have been crowned champion, because he scored 36 points in these meeting(which did not count for the championship) and he finished 32-point away from Roberto Merhi. Spaniard Daniel Juncadella finished in third place after winning Macau Grand Prix.

Teams and drivers 
Four teams registered for the championships; Prema Powerteam, Signature and Motopark Academy from the Formula 3 Euro Series and Carlin from British Formula 3. Guest entries were allowed; all raced in one or two European rounds and/or Macau.

Race calendar 
The provisional six-round calendar included the Korea Super Prix, but this was cancelled three weeks before the event.

Results
The F3 International Trophy took on the same scoring system used in Formula One and other FIA Championships, with points awarded to the top ten finishers.

See also
Formula Three
FIA European Formula Three Championship
Formula Three Euroseries

References

2011 in Formula Three
Formula Three series
Defunct auto racing series
2011 establishments in Europe
2011 establishments in Asia
2011 disestablishments in Europe
2011 disestablishments in Asia